Brian Dong Ho Lee  (c. 1981) is an American songwriter. He has co-written hits such as "Work from Home" by Fifth Harmony, "Let Me Love You" by DJ Snake and Justin Bieber, "Havana" by Camila Cabello, and "Goodbyes" by Post Malone. Lee also co-wrote "Wolves" by Selena Gomez and Marshmello and "Good Time" by Owl City and Carly Rae Jepsen, and contributed to Lady Gaga's 2011 Born This Way album, co-writing "Americano" and providing back-up vocals on "Government Hooker".

Born in Michigan and raised in Queens, New York City, Lee was trained as a classical violinist from the age of 3. He got his start in pop music with a Chicago-area band he formed called Made In Hollywood. Following the dissolution of Made In Hollywood, Lee joined the band the White Tie Affair for a short period of time.

Lee is also a producer, and has co-produced "All Night" by Icona Pop as well as the aforementioned "Goodbyes" by Post Malone. On April 24th, 2020, during the COVID-19 pandemic, Lee was featured as the bassist during Post Malone's well-received Nirvana tribute show and fundraiser for the WHO COVID-19 Solidarity Response Fund.

Songwriting discography

References

Living people
1980s births
American male songwriters